Eric Moyo (born 1982, Zimbabwe) is a Zimbabwean singer and the first winner of Idols East Africa a version of the Idol series. As part of the recording contract, Moyo was assured of US$25,000 in guaranteed album sales from the telecompany Celtel.

Moyo used the prize money to purchase an apartment and went on a vacation.

References

Idols (TV series) winners
21st-century Zimbabwean male singers
Living people
1982 births